Craigellachie (pronounced ) is a locality in British Columbia, located several kilometres to the west of the Eagle Pass summit between Sicamous and Revelstoke. Craigellachie is the site of a tourist stop on the Trans-Canada Highway between Salmon Arm and Revelstoke.

It was named after the village of Craigellachie on the River Spey in Moray, Scotland, the ancestral home of Sir George Stephen, the first president of the Canadian Pacific Railway (CPR). At a critical time in the railway's development, Stephen travelled to Britain to raise desperately needed capital funding; when he succeeded, he telegraphed his associates in Canada quoting the familiar motto of Clan Grant: "Stand fast, Craigellachie!"

The Canadian Craigellachie is most famous for being the site of the "Last Spike" of the CPR, driven by Sir Donald Smith, a director of the CPR, on November 7, 1885.

Gallery

References

External links

Unincorporated settlements in British Columbia
Shuswap Country
Columbia Country
Canadian Pacific Railway stations in British Columbia
Populated places in the Columbia-Shuswap Regional District
Kamloops Division Yale Land District